In video production, a software vision mixer is a piece of software which is able to switch between various video sources. In some cases, this software is also able to composite (combine) video from various sources. It essentially acts as a software version of a hardware vision mixer.

In contrast to a hardware vision mixer, a software vision mixer allows for a larger number of channels, connection types, and transition effects, and allows for greater flexibility of computer-based content integration, text and graphics overlay, and media programming. Another difference between software and hardware vision mixers is that software mixers are limited by the computer's performance. Software vision mixers are generally less expensive than hardware vision mixers.

References 

Video software
Film and video technology